James L. Graham (born 1939) is a senior United States district judge of the United States District Court for the Southern District of Ohio.

Education and career

Born in Columbus, Ohio, Graham received a Bachelor of Arts degree from Ohio State University in 1962 and a Juris Doctor from Ohio State University College of Law that same year. He was thereafter in private practice in Columbus until 1986.

Federal judicial service

On August 15, 1986, Graham was nominated by President Ronald Reagan to a seat on the United States District Court for the Southern District of Ohio vacated by Judge Robert Morton Duncan. Graham was confirmed by the United States Senate on September 25, 1986, and received his commission the following day. He served as Chief Judge from 2003 to 2004, assuming senior status on August 31, 2004.

Notable case

Like many district judges on senior status, Graham occasionally serves with the Court of Appeals on a rotating basis. While serving with the Sixth Circuit Court of Appeals, he supplied a dissenting opinion on a decision upholding the Patient Protection and Affordable Care Act mandate to purchase health insurance.

References

Sources
 

1939 births
Living people
Judges of the United States District Court for the Southern District of Ohio
United States district court judges appointed by Ronald Reagan
20th-century American judges
Ohio State University alumni
Ohio State University Moritz College of Law alumni
Lawyers from Columbus, Ohio
21st-century American judges